Oregon Route 452 (OR 452) is an Oregon state highway running from OR 201 near Adrian to State Line Road at the Idaho state line. OR 452 is known as the Parma Spur No. 489 (see Oregon highways and routes).

OR 452 was established in 2003 as part of Oregon's project to assign route numbers to highways that previously were not assigned, and, as of July 2018, was unsigned.

Route description

OR 452 begins at an intersection with OR 201 at Adrian and heads east, crossing the Snake River and intersecting OR 454 on the east side of the river. The road continues east along Roswell Road to the Idaho state line, where it ends at an intersection with State Line Road.

History

OR 452 was assigned to the Parma Spur of the Succor Creek Highway in 2003.

Major intersections

References

452
Transportation in Malheur County, Oregon